Horn House is a Hakka bar-style house located at Mei County, Xiyang, Fuliang village, Guangdong, China.

Horn House may also refer to:

Horn House (Decorah, Iowa), a historic residence located northwest of Decorah, Iowa, U.S.
Horn family, a Swedish noble family from Finland, recognized by the Swedish House of Nobility
Louis Horn House, Stafford–Olive Historic District, Washington, Franklin County, Missouri, U.S.
Horn House, Rehoboth, Massachusetts, U.S., by Ira Rakatansky (1919–2014), modernist architect

See also
Hopper-Van Horn House, Mahwah, Bergen County, New Jersey, U.S.
Leroy Mayfield House, or Mayfield-Horn House, a historic home in Richland Township, Monroe County, Indiana, U.S.
Thistledome, or Horn-McAuley House or Chalmers/Horn House, a historic house in Byhalia, Mississippi, U.S.
House of Horn, album by Paul Horn
Horn, Germany
Hornhausen, a village in the Börde district in Saxony-Anhalt, Germany
Souvan House, or Hohn House, Ljubljana, Slovenia